Patrick Lynn Swindall (October 18, 1950 – July 11, 2018) was an American politician, attorney, and businessman who served as a Republican member of the U.S. House of Representatives from Georgia's 4th congressional district, based in Atlanta's eastern suburbs, from 1985 to 1989.

Education and career
Born in Gadsden, Alabama, as a youth Swindall worked in and later managed his father Nathan's Atlanta Furniture Store on the corner of Butler (today Jesse Hill Jr. Drive) and Decatur Streets. He earned a B.A. from the University of Georgia in 1972 and obtained his J.D. from the University of Georgia School of Law in 1975. After law school he practiced law with Heyman & Sizemore and, in April 1979, at the age of 28, became its youngest partner to that date. He practiced law in Atlanta until December 31, 1983, when he resigned to run for Congress.

In 1984, with Robb Austin as his campaign manager, Swindall defeated five term Democratic congressman Elliott H. Levitas by six percentage points, an upset election considering Levitas was elected with relative ease since his first election in 1974. He won by a similar margin against actor Ben L. Jones in 1986.<ref>Barone, Michael; and Ujifusa, Grant. The Almanac of American Politics 1988', p. 296. National Journal, 1987.</ref> However, after being indicted for perjury, Swindall lost in a rematch with Jones in 1988 by a 20 point margin.

Perjury conviction
In October 1988, Swindall was indicted on ten counts of perjury related to a money laundering scheme. In recorded dealings with an undercover IRS agent posing as a representative of the Colombian drug cartel, Swindall was told that the $850,000 loan he was seeking to finish building his luxury home included illegal drug money and that he would be part of an operation to "wash" cash. Swindall proposed that an associate set up a mortgage company to funnel the money through.

During an ensuing investigation into the illegal drug trade, Swindall lied to a federal grand jury about his knowledge that the funds were from a drug trafficking operation, which was refuted by the undercover tapes. While one of the perjury charges was dismissed by District Judge Richard C. Freeman, the jury convicted Swindall on nine counts and sentenced him to one year in prison and a fine of $30,450.Long, Kim. "The Almanac of Political Corruption, Scandals & Dirty Politics, (2008). . Swindall's friend, Congressman Barney Frank testified on Swindall's behalf.

On appeal, the Eleventh Circuit Court of Appeals overturned three of the counts, but the U.S. Supreme Court refused to overturn the remaining six and he began serving his one year sentence in 1994. He was disbarred by the Supreme Court of Georgia in 1996.

Later life
Upon his release from prison on February 9, 1995, Swindall hosted a religious-themed conservative radio show on the Providence Broadcasting Network. His show's motto was "Where religion and politics converge." When the Providence Broadcasting Network ceased operations, Swindall announced that he was going to "pursue a prison ministry." Swindall was the owner of multiple businesses in Atlanta and College Park.

In June 2009, a Fulton County grand jury indicted Swindall and two of his fired employees for making illegal campaign contributions to Atlanta City Councilwoman Joyce Sheperd. The businessmen were indicted for making false statements because Swindall was the actual source of the contributions not as reported on Sheperd's campaign disclosure forms as coming from other people, including family and friends of the two former employees. In 2011 the charges were reduced from the felony charges to three misdemeanors. Swindall pleaded no contest to two counts of exceeding the maximum allowable campaign contribution and one count of conspiracy to commit a crime and was sentenced one year of probation.

In November 2009, he was involved in a confrontation with former tenants at a flea market location he owned and had formerly leased to them; Swindall left after College Park code enforcement officers and police arrived. He wanted to remove the walls that delineate the individual stalls within the flea market. Swindall also wanted to remove other structures belonging to him, but the request was denied by the College Park Police.

Swindall was married to former Duke University cheerleader Kimberly Schiesser; together they had seven children. During his time in Congress the two were called the "Barbie and Ken of Politics".

Death
Swindall died in his sleep on July 11, 2018 at his home in Johns Creek, Georgia of an undisclosed cause. He was 67.

See also
List of American federal politicians convicted of crimes
List of federal political scandals in the United States
Bob Barr

BooksA House Divided: A Congressman Examines the Divisive Issues That Face America,'' (1987).

References

External links 

 
 Pat Swindall papers at the University of West Georgia

1950 births
2018 deaths
20th-century American businesspeople
20th-century American lawyers
American perjurers
American talk radio hosts
Businesspeople from Atlanta
Disbarred American lawyers
Georgia (U.S. state) lawyers
Georgia (U.S. state) politicians convicted of crimes
Politicians from Gadsden, Alabama
Politicians from Atlanta
Presbyterians from Georgia (U.S. state)
Radio personalities from Atlanta
Republican Party members of the United States House of Representatives from Georgia (U.S. state)
University of Georgia School of Law alumni
Writers from Alabama
Writers from Atlanta